Faultlines is the debut studio album by Scottish folk musician Karine Polwart, released on 19 January 2004.

Faultlines won the Best Album award at the BBC Radio 2 Folk Awards, with the track "The Sun's Comin' Over The Hill" winning Best Original Song and Polwart herself receiving the Horizon Award for best new artist.

Track listing
All tracks by Karine Polwart, except where noted.

"Only One Way" – 2:53 
"Faultlines" – 3:16 
"Four Strong Walls" – 3:47
"The Sun's Comin' Over The Hill" – 4:57
"Resolution Road" – 3:38 
"Waterlily" – 4:34 
"What Are You Waiting For?" – 2:47 
"Skater of the Surface" – 3:27
"Harder To Walk These Days Than Run" – 3:48 (Polwart/Corrina Hewat)
"The Light On The Shore" – 4:24
"Azalea Flower" – 5:19

References

Karine Polwart albums
2004 albums